A co-operative federation or secondary co-operative is a co-operative in which all members are, in turn, co-operatives.
Historically, co-operative federations have predominantly come in the form of co-operative wholesale societies and co-operative unions. Co-operative federations are a means through which co-operatives can fulfill the sixth Co-operative Principle, co-operation among co-operatives. The International Co-operative Alliance notes that “Co-operatives serve their members most effectively and strengthen the co-operative movement by working together through local, national, regional and international structures.”

Retail
According to co-operative economist Charles Gide, the aim of a co-operative wholesale society, which is owned by retail consumer co-operatives, is to arrange "bulk purchases, and, if possible, organise production". The best historical examples of this were the English and Scottish Co-operative Wholesale Societies, which were the forerunners to the modern Co-operative Group.

Co-operative union
A second common form of co-operative federation is a co-operative union, whose objective (according to Gide) is “to develop the spirit of solidarity among societies and... in a word, to exercise the functions of a government whose authority, it is needless to say, is purely moral.” Co-operatives UK and the International Co-operative Alliance are examples of such arrangements.

Banking

 Austria's Raiffeisen Zentralbank is a cooperative bank with many branches in eastern Europe.
 Germany's Volksbanken or Raiffeisenbank are cooperative banks.
 France's Crédit Agricole is a multi-tiered network of primary and secondary co-operatives and hybrid co-operatives.
 In the UK, The Co-operative Bank is a joint-stock retail and commercial bank, whose stock is wholly owned by The Co-operative Group, a hybrid primary and secondary co-operative.
 In the US, credit unions co-operatively own payment networks and financial advisers.
 In South Korea, National Agricultural Cooperative Federation is a multi-purpose agricultural cooperatives' federation.
 Mexico, Caja Popular Mexicana a, Loan and savings cooperative with more than 1.8 million members.

Agriculture
Regional agricultural co-operatives, such as Land O'Lakes and the former Farmland Industries, are co-operative federations owned by local farmers' co-operatives.  Like the Co-operative Group (above), Land O'Lakes is actually a hybrid of a primary and secondary co-operative.

Co-operative party
In some countries with strong co-operative sectors, such as the UK, co-operatives have organized parliamentary political parties to represent their interests. The British Co-operative Party is an example of such an arrangement.

Other uses
Co-operatives whose member owners are businesses, such as retailers' co-operatives, are sometimes called secondary co-operatives, even when their members are not themselves co-operatives.

See also
 List of co-operative federations

References